Saham al-Jawlan (Saḩam al Jawlān), also known as Saham el-Golan, is a Syrian village in the Daraa Governorate, in the Hauran region. It had a population of 6,572 in 2004. Most residents work in the cultivation of cereals, olives and vegetables.

History

Antiquity
The village has remains dating back to the 4th century. It is also believed to be the biblical city of Golan.

Ottoman period
In 1596 Saham al-Jawlan appeared in the Ottoman tax registers as part of the nahiya of Jawlan Sarqi in the Qada of Hauran. It had a Muslim population consisting of 22 households and 15 bachelors. A fixed tax−rate of 25% were paid on wheat, barley, summer crops, goats and/or beehives; a total of 4,000  akçe.

Zionist activity
In 1891, the Agudat Ahim society headquartered in Yekatrinoslav, Russian Empire, acquired 100,000 dunams of land in Saham al-Jawlan for Jewish agricultural settlement. Due to the Turkish ban on land purchase by Palestinian Jews, the permits were acquired by Baron Edmond de Rothschild. In 1895, the village of Tiferet Binyamin was established on the land, but the Jews were forced to leave in July 1896, when the Ottomans evicted 17 non-Turkish families and issued an order that led to the expulsion of all East European Jews from the Golan Heights. A later attempt to settle the site with Syrian Jews, who were Ottoman citizens, was not successful. In 1921–1930, during the French Mandate, the Palestine Jewish Colonization Association (PICA) obtained the deeds to the Rothschild estate in Saham al-Jawlan and continued to manage it, collecting rent from the Arab peasants living there.

Modern era

From March 2017 to July 2018 Saham al-Jawlan was under the control of the Islamic State of Iraq and the Levant. On 26 July 2018,  the Syrian Army’s 4th Armored Division and Tiger Forces following an intense battle with the ISIS-affiliated Jaysh Khaled bin Walid forces managed to regain control of the town Saham al-Jawlan.

See also
Yavne'el, a village in the Galilee settled in 1901 by Jewish families evicted from Saham al-Jawlan who first took refuge in Metula and Rosh Pinna

References

Bibliography

Schumacher (1889): Across the Jordan; being an exploration and survey of part of Hauran and Jaulan  p 91 ff

External links
 Map of the town, Google Maps
Kafer el Ma-map; 21K

Populated places in Daraa District
 Jewish villages in the Ottoman Empire